4 Cygni is a binary star system in the northern constellation of Cygnus. It is a faintly visible to the naked eye with an apparent visual magnitude of 5.17.

This is single-lined spectroscopic binary with an orbital period of 35 days and an eccentricity of 0.45. It displays an overabundance of iron in the visual spectrum, while the star appears helium-weak in the ultraviolet.

4 Cygni A is an Alpha2 Canum Venaticorum variable that varies by 0.02 magnitude over a period of 0.68674 days. With an age of 145 million years, it has four times the mass of the Sun and five times the Sun's radius. It radiates around 501 times the Sun's luminosity from its photosphere at an effective temperature of 12,190 K.

References

B-type main-sequence stars
Alpha2 Canum Venaticorum variables
Cygnus (constellation)
Binary stars
BD+36 3557
Cygni, 04
183056
095556
7395
Cygni, V1741
Ap stars
Helium-weak stars